The 2012 Campeonato Nacional Apertura Petrobras was the Chilean football top tier’s 90th season. Universidad de Chile was the tournament's champion, after beating O'Higgins on penalties, in the finals.

Regular season

Standings

Results

Playoff stage

Quarterfinals
In the quarterfinals, the 1 seed play the 8 seed, the 2 seed play the 7 seed, the 3 seed play the 6 seed, and the 4 seed play the 5 seed.

Semifinals
In the semifinals, the highest seed play the lowest seed, and the second-highest seed play the second-lowest seed.

Universidad de Chile won 4–2 on aggregate.

2–2 on aggregate. O'Higgins won on away goals rule.

Finals

3–3 on aggregate. Universidad de Chile won on penalties.

Top goalscorers

External links
ANFP
2012 Torneo Apertura at Soccerway
Season regulations

Primera División de Chile seasons
Chile
Prim